The 2000 Kipawa earthquake (or 2000 Kipawa "Millennium" earthquake ) struck Quebec and Ontario, Canada with a moment magnitude of 5.2 at 6:22 a.m. on January 1. It occurred in the Western Quebec Seismic Zone. The shaking was strongest within  of the epicenter. It was felt in Témiscaming, North Bay and as far away as Toronto, making it one of the most significant earthquakes in Canada in 2000. The earthquake was triggered by major thrust faults associated with the Ottawa-Bonnechere Graben.

Minor damage was reported during this earthquake, including fallen light objects, a damaged ventilation pipe and fractures in plaster. Its epicenter was very close to that of the 1935 Timiskaming earthquake and lies in a group of 76 located earthquakes since 1935. Seventeen aftershocks were recorded.

See also
List of earthquakes in 2000
List of earthquakes in Canada

References

2000 disasters in Canada
January 2000 events in Canada
2000 Kipawa
2000 Kipawa
2000 earthquakes